Avadattur is a census town in Salem district  in the state of Tamil Nadu, India.

Demographics
 India census, Avadattur had a population of 8982. Males constitute 53% of the population and females 47%. Avadattur has an average literacy rate of 53%, lower than the national average of 59.5%; with 63% of the males and 37% of females literate. 12% of the population is under 6 years of age.

References

Cities and towns in Salem district